Centrosome-associated protein CEP250 is a protein that in humans is encoded by the CEP250 gene.
This gene encodes a core centrosomal protein required for centriole-centriole cohesion during interphase of the cell cycle. The encoded protein dissociates from the centrosomes when parental centrioles separate at the beginning of mitosis. The protein associates with and is phosphorylated by NIMA-related kinase 2, which is also associated with the centrosome. Furthermore, CEP135 is also required for the centriolar localization of CEP250.

References

External links

Further reading

Centrosome